The term progressive caucus is used to describe American left-leaning caucuses within either the Democratic Party or the Democratic caucus in various legislatures:

 Congressional Progressive Caucus
 Arizona Progressive Democrats
 California Progressive Caucus
 Colorado Progressives
 Idaho Progressive Caucus
 Illinois Progressives
 Kansas Progressive Caucus
 Kentucky Progressive Democratic Caucus
 Maine Progressives
 Michigan - The Justice Caucus
 Minnesota Progressives
 Missouri Progressives
 North Carolina Progressives
 Ohio Progressive Democratic Caucus
 Rhode Island Progressive Caucus
 South Carolina Progressive Caucus
 Texas progressives
 Utah Progressives
 General Assembly Progressive Caucus - Virginia, formed in 2011
 Washington State Progressive Caucus
 Progressive Democrats of Wisconsin
 New York City Council Progressive Caucus (formed May 2010)